David or Dave Black may refer to:
David Black (minister) (1565–1603) Scottish minister
Dave Black (baseball) (1892–1936), American baseball player
Dave Black (drummer) (1928–2006), American jazz drummer
Dave Black (composer) (born 1959), American author and composer
Dave Black (runner) (born 1952), English long-distance runner
David Black (Canadian football) (born 1962), Canadian football offensive lineman
David Black (centre forward) British, footballer with Port Vale
David Black (footballer, born 1868) (1868–1940), Scottish international football (soccer) player
David Black (historian) (born 1936), Western Australian historian
David Black (sculptor) (born 1928), American sculptor
David Alan Black (born 1952), professor of New Testament
David Holmes Black (born 1946), Canadian newspaper publisher
David Macleod Black (born 1941), South African-born Scottish poet
David Black (photographer) (born 1980), American photographer and director 
Stage name of Jay Black (1938–2021), American singer
David Black, 3rd Baronet (1929–2021), of the Black baronets

See also
Black (surname)